The Royal Stuart Society, founded in 1926, is the senior royalist-monarchist organisation and the foremost Jacobite body in the United Kingdom. Its full name is The Royal Stuart Society and Royalist League although it is best known simply as the "Royal Stuart Society." It acknowledges Francis, Duke of Bavaria as head of the Royal House, while refraining from making any claim on his behalf that he does not make himself.  

The society organises annual events to commemorate the major anniversaries of Jacobitism and other events of Stuart and royalist interest.

History
After the First World War, the Jacobite movement was in disarray.  The Royal Stuart Society was established by Captain Henry Stuart Wheatly-Crowe, who served as its first Governor-General, and representatives of the Royalist Association and other defunct or moribund Jacobite bodies.  It considers itself a successor to, and effectively the continuation of, bodies of the Neo-Jacobite Revival, such as the Legitimist Jacobite League of Great Britain and Ireland (founded in 1891 by Herbert Vivian, Ruaraidh Erskine and Melville Henry Massue), the Order of the White Rose and the Thames Valley Legitimist Club.  Among its other founders were Lionel Erskine-Young, 29th Earl of Mar (1891–1965) and Reginald Lindesay-Bethune, 12th Earl of Lindsay (1867–1939).

Objectives
The objectives of the Royal Stuart Society are as follows: (1) to be open to all who have an interest in the members of the Royal House of Stuart, their descendants and supporters; (2) to promote research in and further knowledge of Stuart history; (3) to uphold rightful Monarchy and oppose republicanism; and (4) to arrange such commemorations, lectures and other activities as shall advance these objects.  It describes itself on its website as being “monarchist and traditionalist”.

 the Governor-General was Murray, Duke of St Albans, the Chairman of the Council Julian, Lord Aylmer, and the Acting Principal Secretary Hugh MacPherson.

Activities
The Society organises a variety of events throughout the year. An important part of these events are the commemorations in Whitehall, Windsor and Westminster Abbey. Details of all these events, many of which are open to the public who are always made welcome, appear on the Society's website. A well-attended Service to commemorate the execution of King Charles I is held at his statue in Trafalgar Square on 30 January each year and a wreath is later laid on behalf of the Society on the King's tomb at St George's Chapel, Windsor at the beginning of Choral Evensong. The execution of Mary, Queen of Scots, is remembered with a Service at her tomb in Westminster Abbey on 8 February. The nativity of King James VII and II is marked by prayers and the laying of flowers at his statue outside the National Gallery on 14 October. The Society also holds an annual dinner which commemorates Restoration Day and White Rose Day. An informal party for members is usually held in November. The Society's lectures take place at the parish hall of the Jesuit church at Farm Street in London's Mayfair.  Newsletters with details of people, events and news of the Society are produced and edited by the Principal Secretary and sent to members during the year.  The Society publishes the Royal Stuart Journal annually and this is available to non-members via the website.  The Journal recently replaced a series of publications called Royal Stuart Papers (still available from the Society) which included papers by a number of well known historians such as Roy Porter, Richard Sharpe, Murray Pittock, Eveline Cruickshanks, Lady Antonia Fraser and Ronald Hutton.

References

Jacobitism
Monarchist organizations
1926 establishments in the United Kingdom
Organizations established in 1926
Clubs and societies in Norfolk
Monarchism in the United Kingdom